Martin Waltham Bates (February 24, 1786 – January 1, 1869) was a lawyer and politician from Dover, in Kent County, Delaware. He was a member of the Federalist Party, and then the Democratic Party, who served in the Delaware General Assembly and as U.S. Senator from Delaware.

Early life and family
Bates was born in Salisbury, Connecticut. He married Mary Hillyard, the daughter of Charles Hillyard. They lived in Dover, at "Woodburn," presently the Delaware Governor's mansion, and were members of the Presbyterian Church. After moving to Delaware, Bates taught school, studied medicine and the law. He was admitted to the Bar in 1822, and practiced in Dover the remainder of his life.

Political career
Bates served in the State House in the 1826 session and was a member of the Delaware Constitutional Convention of 1852. He became U.S. Senator in 1857 when he was elected by the General Assembly to fill the vacancy caused by the death of U.S. Senator John M. Clayton, which had been briefly filled by the appointment of Joseph P. Comegys. He served only the remainder of the term, from January 14, 1857, to March 3, 1859, as he was defeated for reelection in 1858 by Willard Saulsbury, Sr.

Death and legacy
Bates died at Dover and is buried there in the Old Presbyterian Cemetery, on the grounds of the Delaware State Museum.

Almanac
Elections were held the first Tuesday of October. Members of the General Assembly took office on the first Tuesday of January. State Representatives had a term of one year. The General Assembly chose the U.S. Senators, who took office March 4 for a six-year term. They also chose the delegates to the Constitutional Convention of 1852.

References

External links

Biographical Dictionary of the United States Congress
Delaware’s Members of Congress
 
The Political Graveyard 
Biographical Dictionary of the United States Congress; portrait courtesy of the Library of Congress.

1786 births
1869 deaths
People from Dover, Delaware
American Presbyterians
Delaware lawyers
Delaware Federalists
Democratic Party members of the Delaware House of Representatives
Democratic Party United States senators from Delaware
Burials in Dover, Delaware
19th-century American politicians
19th-century American lawyers